The Apple Hard Disk 20SC is Apple's first SCSI based hard drive for the Apple II family as well as the Macintosh and other third party computers using an industry standard SCSI interface.

History
Released in September 1986 along with the Apple IIGS (which required an optional SCSI interface card to use it), it debuted over 9 months after the introduction of the Macintosh Plus, the first to include Apple's SCSI interface. It was a welcome addition, delivering considerably faster data transfer rates (up to 1.25 megabytes per second) than its predecessors, the Hard Disk 20 (62.5 Kilobytes per second) and ProFile.

Hardware
The 20SC originally contained a half height 5.25" Seagate ST-225N 20MB SCSI hard drive, but was later manufactured with a full-height 3.5" MiniScribe 8425SA 20MB SCSI hard drive. The latter drive was the same size as the drive inside the Macintosh Hard Disk 20, but 10 to 15 MB over what had previously been offered by Apple for the II family. The same drive mechanism would also be offered 6 months later as a built-in drive option on the Macintosh II and SE. It had two standard Centronics 50-pin connectors, one for the System and one for daisy-chaining additional SCSI devices and a SCSI ID selection switch. An external terminator was required if it was the only SCSI device connected. The case itself could accommodate a 3.5" or 5.25" full-height hard drive mechanism. Indeed, the case design would be reused unchanged (in Platinum only) for 3 more models introduced the following year: 40SC, 80SC & 160SC (offering respective Megabytes of storage). While the transfer rates were significantly higher due to the faster SCSI bus technology, the actual transfer rate varied from computer to computer thanks to different SCSI implementation based on developing industry standards.

Design
In addition to being the first cross-platform drive offered by Apple it was the first hard drive to use the Snow White design language. Notably, it was the only Snow White product to use the Macintosh beige color and one of the few Apple products to be introduced in two different colors at the same time. Since the Apple IIGS was the first Apple product to debut in the new gray color they called Platinum, the 20SC had to both match it and the beige color of the Macintosh Plus, which it is designed to sit perfectly beneath. In 1987, all Apple products would change to Platinum, which would remain in use for the next 10 years.

See also
List of Apple drives

References

Apple Hard Disk 20SC Owner's Guide (1986)

Apple II family
Apple Inc. peripherals
Macintosh peripherals
Apple II peripherals
SCSI
Hard disk drives